William Delafield Cook AM (1936–2015) was an Australian artist who was known for his photorealistic landscapes. He won a number of awards, including the Order of Australia.

Early life
Delafield Cook was born in Melbourne, Australia on 28 February 1936.  His grandfather, who was also named William Delafield Cook, was also a painter and had links to the Heidelberg School of Australian painting.

In 1962 he married 1962 Sally Patricia Bovington, with whom he had two daughters, and a son, the artist Jonathan Delafield Cook. 

In 1980 he won the Wynne Prize for A Waterfall (Strath Creek), and in 1981 he won the Sulman Prize for A French family.

He taught at the University of Melbourne.

In 2013 he was appointed a Member of the Order of Australia for "significant service to the visual arts as a realist painter of Australian landscapes".

He died after a brief illness in London on 29 March 2015, where he had been preparing for an exhibition; he was aged 79.He had long divided his time between London and Melbourne.

Notes

References

Pierse, Simon, Australian Art and Artists in London, 1950-1965: An Antipodean Summer Retrieved November 2012
Sayers, Andrew, Australian Art, Oxford University Press Retrieved November 2012
Obituary of William Delafield Cook, The Independent, 14 May 2015 Retrieved 13 August 2020

External links
William Delafield Cook Retrieved November 2012

1936 births
2015 deaths
Australian landscape painters
Wynne Prize winners
Members of the Order of Australia
Australian expatriates in the United Kingdom
People from Caulfield, Victoria
Artists from Melbourne
20th-century Australian male artists
20th-century Australian painters